Dan Haifley is an American environmentalist and newspaper columnist.

From 1999 to 2019, he was Executive Director of O'Neill Sea Odyssey, a non-profit organization offering a free oceanography and ecology program for school-aged youth sailing Monterey Baya bay of the Pacific Ocean, along the central coast of California. Rachel Kippen took over the position upon his retirement in March, 2019.

Career
From 1986 to 1993, Haifley was Executive Director of Save Our Shores, based in Santa Cruz, California, where he spearheaded the creation of the Monterey Bay National Marine Sanctuary as Co-Chair of the Environmental Working Group which successfully focused on obtaining a boundary extending north to Gulf of the Farallones National Marine Sanctuary to prevent offshore oil drilling. He also led the effort against offshore oil drilling, including passage of twenty-six local ordinances in California counties and cities limiting development of onshore facilities for offshore drilling, and their defense against a lawsuit by the oil industry as represented by the Western Oil and Gas Association.

Haifley wrote the column "Our Ocean Backyard" for the Santa Cruz Sentinel newspaper until April, 2019, when Rachel Kippen took over writing duties.

In August 2011, he was given the Ocean Hero award by Save Our Shores.

According to the book Jack O'Neill: It's Always Summer on the Inside (2011) by Drew Kampion, Haifleyas the program's executive directorhas argued the program's position that ocean concepts should be adopted in formal education standards and made more widely available to youth from economically disadvantaged backgrounds.

See also

 List of people from California

References

Year of birth missing (living people)
Place of birth missing (living people)
20th-century births
20th-century American non-fiction writers
21st-century American non-fiction writers
Activists from California
American activist journalists
American columnists
American newspaper journalists
American non-fiction environmental writers
Journalists from California
Living people
Writers from Santa Cruz, California